Budi Gunawan (born 11 December 1959) is the Chief of the Indonesian State Intelligence Agency (BIN) since September 9 2016, and is also the General Chairman of the Indonesian E-Sports Executive Board (PB ESI). Before serving as Chief of BIN, he served as Deputy Chief of Indonesian National Police accompanying National Police Chief Badrodin Haiti and Tito Karnavian. He is the second member of the police officer after Sutanto to lead the State Intelligence Agency.

Career 
Graduating from the Indonesian National Police Academy in 1983, Gunawan pursued further education, completing the Sespimpol (1988) and Lemhannas (2005) programs.  He also earned a Summa Cum Laude distinction in the law doctoral program at Trisakti University (2018).

In the Indonesian National Police, Gunawan held positions such as Chief of the Bali Police, Head of the National Police Education Institute, and Deputy Chief of Police. He also served as Adjutant to the Vice President (1999-2000) and President of the Republic of Indonesia (2000-2004) during Megawati Soekarnoputri's administration.

In 2015, he was controversially named as the sole candidate for National Police Chief to replace retiring General Sutarman. Media reports noted his bank accounts contained hundreds of billions of rupiah, from many suspicious transactions became the investigation target by anti-corruption body (KPK) and he was named a corruption suspect. He filed a pre-trial motion, which was accepted. Eventually, General Badrodin Haiti was appointed acting National Police chief instead of him.

Appointed as Chief of BIN in 9 September 2016, Gunawan has focused on modernizing the agency. He established new divisions such as the Deputy for Cyber Intelligence and the Deputy for Apparatus Security Intelligence.  Additionally, he formed the Medical Intelligence division, "Wangsa Avatara," to address biosecurity threats.

Gunawan has also invested in education for intelligence professionals, developing the State Intelligence College (STIN) and the Pusdiklat training center. In 2018, he was appointed as a Professor at STIN.

Under Gunawan's guidance, BIN has become more actively involved in supporting government programs and addressing pressing public concerns. Examples of such involvement include handling the Covid-19 pandemic, disaster management, counter-terrorism efforts, and addressing the conflict in Papua.

Beyond intelligence and law enforcement, Gunawan became the catalyst for development of Nusantara Student Dormitory (Indonesian: Asrama Mahasiswa Nusantara, abbreviated as AMN) and the Papua Youth Creative Hub (PYCH). AMN brings together students from all provinces in Indonesia, promoting cross-cultural understanding and unity. PYCH, on the other hand, provides training and resources for young Papuans, empowering them and supporting local economic development. 

In 2020, Gunawan was appointed General Chairman of the Indonesian E-Sports Executive Board.

Job history 

 Chief of Sector Police of Tanjung Karang Barat, Bandar Lampung
 Chief of Traffic Unit, Resort Police of Palembang City
 Chief of Resort Police of Bogor City
 Secretary of Traffic Directorate, Regional Police of Lampung
 Head of Division in Traffice Directorate, INP
 Aide of Vice President Megawati Soekarnoputri (1999–2001)
 Aide of President Megawati Soekarnoputri (2001–2004)
 Head of the Career Development Bureau INP (2004–2006)
 Head of Officer School INP (2006–2008)
 Chief of Regional Police of Jambi (2008–2009)
 Head of Legal Development Division INP (2009–2010)
 Head of Profession and Security INP (2010–2012)
 Chief of Regional Police of Bali (2012)
 Head of Educational Institution of INP (2012–2015)
 Deputy Chief of INP (2015–2016)
 Chief of State Intelligence Agency (2016–present)
 General Chairman of the Indonesian E-Sports Executive Board (2020-present)

Publications 

 Colonies of Justice (Forum Media Utama, 2006) 
 Terrorism: Myths and Conspiracies (Forum Media Utama, 2006) 
 Building Police Competence (Yayasan Pengembangan Kajian Ilmu Kepolisian, 2006) 
 Tips for Future Police Success (Personal Development Training, 2007) 
 Lies in Cyberspace (Kepustakaan Populer Gramedia, 2018) 
 Democracy in the Post Truth Era (Kepustakaan Populer Gramedia, 2021) 
 Social Media Between Two Poles (Rayyana Komunikasindo, 2021) 
 Power of Cyber (Rayyana Komunikasindo, 2022)
 Forming Mind War Man (Rayyana Komunikasindo, 2022)

Commendations

Honors

Brevet 

 Brevet Para
 Brevet Diving
 Brevet Investigator
 Brevet Bhayangkara Bahari

References